In four-dimensional Euclidean geometry, the 4-simplex honeycomb, 5-cell honeycomb or pentachoric-dispentachoric honeycomb is a space-filling tessellation honeycomb. It is composed of 5-cells and rectified 5-cells facets in a ratio of 1:1.

Structure
Cells of the vertex figure are ten tetrahedrons and 20 triangular prisms, corresponding to the ten 5-cells and 20 rectified 5-cells that meet at each vertex. All the vertices lie in parallel realms in which they form alternated cubic honeycombs, the tetrahedra being either tops of the rectified 5-cell or the bases of the 5-cell, and the octahedra being the bottoms of the rectified 5-cell.

Alternate names
 Cyclopentachoric tetracomb
 Pentachoric-dispentachoric tetracomb

Projection by folding 

The 5-cell honeycomb can be projected into the 2-dimensional square tiling by a geometric folding operation that maps two pairs of mirrors into each other, sharing the same vertex arrangement:

A4 lattice 
The vertex arrangement of the 5-cell honeycomb is called the A4 lattice, or 4-simplex lattice. The 20 vertices of its vertex figure, the runcinated 5-cell represent the 20 roots of the  Coxeter group.  It is the 4-dimensional case of a simplectic honeycomb.

The A lattice is the union of five A4 lattices, and is the dual to the omnitruncated 5-simplex honeycomb, and therefore the Voronoi cell of this lattice is an omnitruncated 5-cell
  ∪  ∪  ∪  ∪  = dual of

Related polytopes and honeycombs 

The tops of the 5-cells in this honeycomb adjoin the bases of the 5-cells, and vice versa, in adjacent laminae (or layers); but alternating laminae may be inverted so that the tops of the rectified 5-cells adjoin the tops of the rectified 5-cells and the bases of the 5-cells adjoin the bases of other 5-cells. This inversion results in another non-Wythoffian uniform convex honeycomb. Octahedral prisms and tetrahedral prisms may be inserted in between alternated laminae as well, resulting in two more non-Wythoffian elongated uniform honeycombs.

Rectified 5-cell honeycomb 

The rectified 4-simplex honeycomb or rectified 5-cell honeycomb is a space-filling tessellation honeycomb.

Alternate names
 small cyclorhombated pentachoric tetracomb
 small prismatodispentachoric tetracomb

Cyclotruncated 5-cell honeycomb

The cyclotruncated 4-simplex honeycomb or cyclotruncated 5-cell honeycomb is a space-filling tessellation honeycomb. It can also be seen as a birectified 5-cell honeycomb.

It is composed of 5-cells, truncated 5-cells,  and bitruncated 5-cells facets in a ratio of 2:2:1. Its vertex figure is a tetrahedral antiprism, with 2 regular tetrahedron, 8 triangular pyramid, and 6 tetragonal disphenoid cells, defining 2 5-cell, 8 truncated 5-cell, and 6 bitruncated 5-cell facets around a vertex.

It can be constructed as five sets of parallel hyperplanes that divide space into two half-spaces. The 3-space hyperplanes contain quarter cubic honeycombs as a collection facets.

Alternate names
 Cyclotruncated pentachoric tetracomb
 Small truncated-pentachoric tetracomb

Truncated 5-cell honeycomb

The truncated 4-simplex honeycomb or truncated 5-cell honeycomb is a space-filling tessellation honeycomb. It can also be called a cyclocantitruncated 5-cell honeycomb.

Alaternate names 
 Great cyclorhombated pentachoric tetracomb
 Great truncated-pentachoric tetracomb

Cantellated 5-cell honeycomb 

The cantellated 4-simplex honeycomb or cantellated 5-cell honeycomb is a space-filling tessellation honeycomb. It can also be called a cycloruncitruncated 5-cell honeycomb.

Alternate names
 Cycloprismatorhombated pentachoric tetracomb
 Great prismatodispentachoric tetracomb

Bitruncated 5-cell honeycomb

The bitruncated 4-simplex honeycomb or bitruncated 5-cell honeycomb is a space-filling tessellation honeycomb. It can also be called a cycloruncicantitruncated 5-cell honeycomb.

Alternate names
 Great cycloprismated pentachoric tetracomb
 Grand prismatodispentachoric tetracomb

Omnitruncated 5-cell honeycomb

The omnitruncated 4-simplex honeycomb or omnitruncated 5-cell honeycomb is a space-filling tessellation honeycomb.  It can also be seen as a cyclosteriruncicantitruncated 5-cell honeycomb.
.

It is composed entirely of omnitruncated 5-cell (omnitruncated 4-simplex) facets.

Coxeter calls this Hinton's honeycomb after C. H. Hinton,  who described it in his book The Fourth Dimension in 1906.

The facets of all  omnitruncated simplectic honeycombs are called permutohedra and can be positioned in n+1 space with integral coordinates, permutations of the whole numbers (0,1,..,n).

Alternate names
 Omnitruncated cyclopentachoric tetracomb
 Great-prismatodecachoric tetracomb

A4* lattice 

The A lattice is the union of five A4 lattices, and is the dual to the omnitruncated 5-cell honeycomb, and therefore the Voronoi cell of this lattice is an omnitruncated 5-cell.
  ∪  ∪  ∪  ∪  = dual of

Alternated form 

This honeycomb can be alternated, creating omnisnub 5-cells with irregular 5-cells created at the deleted vertices. Although it is not uniform, the 5-cells have a symmetry of order 10.

See also
Regular and uniform honeycombs in 4-space:
Tesseractic honeycomb
16-cell honeycomb
24-cell honeycomb
Truncated 24-cell honeycomb
Snub 24-cell honeycomb

Notes

References 
 Norman Johnson Uniform Polytopes, Manuscript (1991)
 Kaleidoscopes: Selected Writings of H.S.M. Coxeter, edited by F. Arthur Sherk, Peter McMullen, Anthony C. Thompson, Asia Ivic Weiss, Wiley-Interscience Publication, 1995,  
 (Paper 22) H.S.M. Coxeter, Regular and Semi Regular Polytopes I, [Math. Zeit. 46 (1940) 380–407, MR 2,10] (1.9 Uniform space-fillings)
 (Paper 24) H.S.M. Coxeter, Regular and Semi-Regular Polytopes III, [Math. Zeit. 200 (1988) 3-45]
 George Olshevsky, Uniform Panoploid Tetracombs, Manuscript (2006) (Complete list of 11 convex uniform tilings, 28 convex uniform honeycombs, and 143 convex uniform tetracombs) Model 134
 , x3o3o3o3o3*a - cypit - O134, x3x3x3x3x3*a - otcypit - 135, x3x3x3o3o3*a - gocyropit - O137, x3x3o3x3o3*a - cypropit  - O138, x3x3x3x3o3*a - gocypapit - O139, x3x3x3x3x3*a - otcypit - 140
 Affine Coxeter group Wa(A4), Quaternions, and Decagonal Quasicrystals, Mehmet Koca, Nazife O. Koca, Ramazan Koc (2013) 

Honeycombs (geometry)
5-polytopes